Ziegfeld: The Man and His Women is a 1978 television biopic based on the life of theater impresario Florenz Ziegfeld. It was directed by Buzz Kulik and stars Paul Shenar as Ziegfeld, Samantha Eggar as Billie Burke, Barbara Parkins as Anna Held, Walter Willison as Frank Carter, Catherine Jacoby (aka Loria Parker) as Fanny Brice, and Inga Swenson as Nora Bayes. It was produced by Columbia Pictures (filmed at Warner's Burbank Studios) and first aired on NBC in May 1978.  Patricia Ziegfeld Stephenson, daughter of Ziegfeld and Billie Burke, was a consultant on the film. The film was nominated for several Emmy Awards for 1978 winning in the cinematography category, Gerald Finnerman.

The film has been shown in various versions. It originally aired on NBC, with commercials. It later showed up on Showtime cable in the 1980s without the commercial disruption which allowed a better flow of the episodic segments. Another truncated (shortened) version has appeared on Starz cable.

Synopsis
A chronicle of Florenz Ziegfeld's life from his earliest memories in Chicago, recounting the Fire of 1871 to the many luminaries he was connected to. The storyline is episodic with many of the key women in his life introducing segments in which they were involved with Ziegfeld, some for the better, some for the worst.  Other important historical people include Bert Williams, Irving Berlin, Eddie Cantor, Charles Frohman and Nora Bayes.

Cast
Paul Shenar – Florenz Ziegfeld
Samantha Eggar – Billie Burke
David Levy – Irving Berlin
Barbara Parkins – Anna Held
Pamela Peadon – Marilyn Miller
Valerie Perrine – Lillian Lorraine
Walter Willison – Frank Carter
Gene McLaughlin – Will Rogers
Richard Shea – Eddie Cantor
Catherine Jacoby – Fanny Brice
David Downing – Bert Williams
Inga Swenson – Nora Bayes
Ron Husmann – Jack Norworth
Cliff Norton – Abe Erlanger
David Opatoshu – Florenz's father
Bruce Willis - Extra (uncredited)

See also
The Great Ziegfeld (1936)

References

External links
 Ziegfeld: The Man and His Women at IMDb.com

 A DVD version, Truetvmovies

1978 television films
1978 films
Films directed by Buzz Kulik
Columbia Pictures films
1970s biographical drama films
Biographical television films
American biographical drama films
1970s American films